Boda Borg is a chain of entertainment facilities located throughout Sweden, as well as in Ireland, Switzerland and the United States. Each location consists of multiple "quests," which each contain a series of rooms. The patrons of the facility must use either mental or physical skills to proceed into the next room and eventually the end of the quest. As of 2020, it operates seven locations in Sweden, located in Karlskoga, Karlskrona, Oxelösund, Skellefteå, Sävsjö, Torpshammar, and Östersund; one location in Ireland, located in Lough Key Forest Park; one location in Switzerland, located in Zürich; and one location in the U.S., located in Malden, Massachusetts.

History
The first facility was opened in 1995 in Torpshammar, Sweden, a village located in the Ånge Municipality. It was the result of a government project to find new ideas in the context of rural development in northern Sweden.

In 2008, current CEO David Spigner and three other investors purchased Boda Borg and formed the international Boda Borg Corporation, which is headquartered in Laguna Hills, California.

In 2015, entrepreneur Chad Ellis opened Boda Borg Boston in Malden, Massachusetts. This was Boda Borg's first location in the United States.

References

External links
Boda Borg US Website

Escape rooms